Abdurashid (Jabdraşid-Otar) is a rural locality (a selo) in Pokrovsky Selsoviet of Khasavyurtovsky District, Dagestan, Russia. The population was 316 as of 2010.

Geography 
Abdurashid is located 18 km north of Khasavyurt (the district's administrative centre) by road.

Ethnicity 
The village is inhabited by Chechens and Avars.

References 

Rural localities in Khasavyurtovsky District